Selim Benachour (born Slim Ben-Achour on 8 September 1981) is a football coach and former professional player who played as a attacking midfielder. He is an assistant coach for the Tunisia national team.

Born in France, he represented Tunisia at international level.

Club career

Paris Saint-Germain
Born and brought up in Paris, Selim Benachour learned to play his trade at the Paris Saint-Germain academy. Benachour began his professional club career with Paris Saint-Germain in 2001 and stayed in the club until 2005.

After his two loan transfers, he went back to PSG after this, playing on and off for them over the next two seasons. Overall he earned 28 caps for his childhood club, scoring one goal.

With PSG, he appeared in 28 league matches and scored a goal, alongside winning the Coupe de France in 2004.<ref> Report on French federation site (PSG	1 – 0	Châteauroux) ''fff.fr. Retrieved 24 March 2021</ref>

Out on loan from PSG
He was given twice on loan from Paris Saint-Germain to Martigues in 2002 and Troyes in 2003. He was sent to Championnat de France amateur (4th tier) club Martigues on a season long loan spell. He played regularly for the Martigues first team, scoring one goal in 28 appearances. Next season he was sent on loan to Ligue 2 side ES Troyes AC, who had just narrowly avoided bankruptcy and were just trying to survive for the time being. Benachour had trouble getting into their team, making 9 appearances over the season, scoring twice.

Vitoria
In 2005, he left France and moved to Portugal, signing with Vitória Guimarães, where he enjoyed one successful season at the club.

Rubin Kazan
The next season, he signed a contract with the Russian side Rubin Kazan, where he played for two seasons and appeared in 23 league matches, scoring 3 goals. He was in Kazan's 2006 La Manga Cup winning squad.

Al Qadsia
After two seasons with Kazan, he moved to Kuwait and signed for Kuwaiti Premier League side Al Qadsia and played there until 2009. With Qadsia, he won the 2008–09 Kuwaiti Premier League.

Malaga
In 2009, he signed with the Spanish La Liga side Málaga. On 13 September 2010 he was not registered to play in La Liga and was released by the club, with one year still left on his contract.

Maritimo
On 21 January 2011, he returned to Portugal and signed a contract with the Marítimo until the end of the 2011–2012 season.

APOEL
On 16 June 2012, Benachour signed a two-year contract with the Cypriot club APOEL. On 23 August 2012, he scored his first goal with APOEL in a Europa League play-off round match against Neftchi Baku in Dalga Arena, equalising the score in the 83rd minute, in a match which ended with 1–1 draw. He became a champion with APOEL after helping his club to win the 2012–13 Cypriot First Division. During the 2013–14 season, he appeared in two 2013–14 UEFA Europa League group stage matches for APOEL and won all the titles in Cyprus, the Cypriot League, the Cypriot Cup and the Cypriot Super Cup.

Mumbai City
On 28 July 2015, he signed for Indian Super League club Mumbai City FC managed by his former teammate Nicolas Anelka. With Mumbai, he appeared in 11 matches with 3 assists and 1 goal, as the club finished 6th in the 2015 Indian Super League season.

Martigues
After the end of his stint with Mumbai, he came back to France in 2016 and signed with Championnat National 2 side FC Martigues. From 2016 to 2018, he appeared in 15 league matches with Martigues, scoring 2 goals.

International career
He was widely considered one of Tunisia's best players, an elegant playmaker with range of passing and great vision, and played for Tunisia's national squad in the 2002 World Cup. However, he was not included in the squad for the 2006 World Cup in Germany, in which Tunisia national football team were knocked out in the first round. He was part of the national squad, that emerged as the champions of the 2004 African Cup of Nations, defeating Morocco.

Sources suggest he turned down the chance to play for the France national football team in favour of the Tunisia national football team.

He made his international debut on 11 January 2002 against Cameroon in a friendly match which ended as their 1-0 defeat. Between 2002 and 2010, he earned 44 caps for Tunisia and scored 2 goals.

Managerial career
Overall, he made over 250 appearances at senior level throughout his career before retiring and in 2016, Benachour became the Head Coach at Martigues FC U17, where he won the Provincial Cup and then came runners-up in the league before moving up to the U19 team. Later he joined Foresta Suceava in Romania as manager and guided the club to a 5th place finish.

He then occupied the post of Technical Director as well as briefly the Head Coach role at Olimpia Grudziądz in Poland’s top division.

Moving to England, the UEFA A licence holder Benachour took up the position of under-18s manager at Oldham Athletic in September 2020.

He became caretaker first team head coach of Oldham Athletic on 24th November 2021, following the departure of Keith Curle.

Career statistics
International goals
Scores and results list Tunisia's goal tally first.

Managerial statistics

Honours
Country
Tunisia
 Africa Cup of Nations 
 Champions (1): 2004

Club
Paris Saint-GermainCoupe de France Champions (1): 2004
QadsiaKuwaiti Premier League
 Champions (1): 2008–09
APOEL
Cypriot First Division
 Champions (2): 2012–13, 2013–14
Cypriot Cup
 Champions (1): 2013–14
Cypriot Super Cup
 Champions (1): 2013

Personal life
Benachour was born in Paris, France, and is multilingual. He speaks fluent French, English, Spanish and Portuguese.

References

External links
APOEL official profile

Interview-biography 

1981 births
Living people
Citizens of Tunisia through descent
Tunisian footballers
Tunisian expatriate footballers
Tunisia international footballers
Paris Saint-Germain F.C. players
INF Clairefontaine players
FC Martigues players
ES Troyes AC players
Vitória S.C. players
FC Rubin Kazan players
Málaga CF players
C.S. Marítimo players
APOEL FC players
Mumbai City FC players
La Liga players
Ligue 1 players
Primeira Liga players
Russian Premier League players
Cypriot First Division players
2002 FIFA World Cup players
2002 African Cup of Nations players
2004 African Cup of Nations players
2005 FIFA Confederations Cup players
2006 Africa Cup of Nations players
Association football midfielders
Footballers from Paris
French sportspeople of Tunisian descent
Expatriate footballers in Kuwait
Expatriate footballers in Portugal
Expatriate footballers in Russia
Expatriate footballers in Spain
Expatriate footballers in Cyprus
Expatriate footballers in India
Tunisian expatriate sportspeople in Kuwait
Tunisian expatriate sportspeople in Portugal
Tunisian expatriate sportspeople in Russia
Tunisian expatriate sportspeople in Spain
Tunisian expatriate sportspeople in Cyprus
Tunisian football managers
ACS Foresta Suceava managers
Mediterranean Games gold medalists for Tunisia
Mediterranean Games medalists in football
Competitors at the 2001 Mediterranean Games
Tunisian expatriate sportspeople in India
Tunisian expatriate football managers
Qadsia SC players
Kuwait Premier League players
Oldham Athletic A.F.C. non-playing staff
Oldham Athletic A.F.C. managers
Olimpia Grudziądz managers
French footballers